The Clock of the Long Now, also called the 10,000-year clock, is a mechanical clock under construction that is designed to keep time for 10,000 years. It is being built by the Long Now Foundation. A two-meter prototype is on display at the Science Museum in London. , two more prototypes are on display at The Long Now Museum & Store at Fort Mason Center in San Francisco.

The project was conceived by Danny Hillis in 1986. The first prototype of the clock began working on December 31, 1999, just in time to display the transition to the year 2000. At midnight on New Year's Eve, the date indicator changed from 01999 to 02000, and the chime struck twice.

The manufacture and site construction of the first full-scale prototype clock is being funded by Jeff Bezos's Bezos Expeditions, with $42 million, and is on land which Bezos owns in Texas.

Purpose 
In the words of Stewart Brand, a founding board member of the foundation, "Such a clock, if sufficiently impressive and well-engineered, would embody deep time for people. It should be charismatic to visit, interesting to think about, and famous enough to become iconic in the public discourse. Ideally, it would do for thinking about time what the photographs of Earth from space have done for thinking about the environment. Such icons reframe the way people think."

Design 

The basic design principles and requirements for the clock are:

 Longevity: The clock should be accurate even after 10,000 years, and must not contain valuable parts (such as jewels, expensive metals, or special alloys) that might be looted.
 Maintainability: Future generations should be able to keep the clock working, if necessary, with nothing more advanced than Bronze Age tools and materials.
 Transparency: The clock should be understandable without stopping or disassembling it; no functionality should be opaque.
 Evolvability: It should be possible to improve the clock over time.
 Scalability: To ensure that the final large clock will work properly, smaller prototypes must be built and tested.

Whether the clock will actually receive continued care and maintenance for such a long time is debatable. Hillis chose the 10,000-year goal to be just within the limits of plausibility. There are technological artifacts, such as fragments of pots and baskets, from 10,000 years in the past, so there is some precedent for human artifacts surviving this long, although very few human artifacts have been continuously tended for more than a few centuries.

Power considerations 
Many options were considered for the power source of the clock, but most were rejected due to their inability to meet the requirements. For example, nuclear power and solar power systems would violate the principles of transparency and longevity. In the end, Hillis decided to require regular human winding of a falling weight design for updating the clock face because the clock design already assumes regular human maintenance.

However the clock is designed to keep time even when not being wound: "If there is no attention for long periods of time the Clock uses the energy captured by changes in the temperature between day and night on the mountain top above to power its time-keeping apparatus."

Timing considerations 
The timing mechanism for such a long lasting clock needs to be reliable and robust as well as accurate. The options considered but rejected as sources of timing for the clock included:

Self-contained clocks 
Most of these methods are inaccurate (the clock will slowly lose the correct time), but are reliable (that is, the clock will not suddenly stop working). Other methods are accurate but opaque (meaning that the clock is difficult to read or understand).
 gravity pendulum (inaccurate over the long term, and requires many ticks, which creates wear)
 torsion pendulum (fewer ticks, but less accurate)
 balance wheel (more inaccurate than pendulum)
 water flow (inaccurate)
 solid material flow (inaccurate)
 wear and corrosion (very inaccurate)
 rolling balls (very inaccurate)
 diffusion (inaccurate)
 tuning fork (inaccurate)
 pressure chamber cycle (inaccurate)
 inertial governor (inaccurate)
 atomic oscillator (opaque, difficult to maintain)
 piezoelectric crystal oscillator (opaque, difficult to maintain)
 atomic decay (opaque, difficult to measure precisely)

External events that the clock could track or be adjusted by 
Many of these methods are accurate (some external cycles are very uniform over huge stretches of time) but unreliable (the clock could stop working completely if it failed to track the external event properly). Others have separate difficulties.
 daily temperature cycle (unreliable)
 seasonal temperature cycle (imprecise)
 tidal forces (difficult to measure)
 Earth's rotating inertial frame (difficult to measure accurately)
 stellar alignment (unreliable because of weather)
 solar alignment (unreliable because of weather)
 tectonic motion (difficult to predict and measure)
 orbital dynamics (difficult to scale)

Hillis concluded that no single source of timing could meet the requirements. As a compromise the clock will use an accurate but unreliable timer to adjust an inaccurate but reliable timer, creating a phase-locked loop.

In the current design, a slow mechanical oscillator, based on a torsional pendulum, keeps time inaccurately, but reliably. At noon, the light from the Sun, a timer that is accurate but (due to weather) unreliable, is concentrated on a segment of metal through a lens. The metal buckles and the buckling force resets the clock to noon. The combination can, in principle, provide both reliability and long-term accuracy.

Displaying the time and date 
Many of the usual units displayed on clocks, such as hours and calendar dates, may have little meaning after 10,000 years. However, every human culture counts days, months (in some form), and years, all of which are based on lunar and solar cycles. There are also longer natural cycles, such as the 25,765-year precession of Earth's axis. On the other hand, the clock is a product of our time, and it seems appropriate to pay homage to our current arbitrary systems of time measurement. In the end, it seemed best to display both the natural cycles and some of the current cultural cycles.

The center of the clock will show a star field, indicating both the sidereal day and the precession of the zodiac. Around this will be a display showing the positions of the Sun and the Moon in the sky, as well as the phase and angle of the Moon. Outside this will be the ephemeral dial, showing the year according to our current Gregorian calendar system. This will be a five-digit display, indicating the current year in a format like "02000" instead of the more usual "2000" (to avoid a Y10K problem). Hillis and Brand plan, if they can, to add a mechanism whereby the power source generates only enough energy to keep track of time; if visitors want to see the time displayed, they would have to manually supply some energy themselves.

Time calculations 
Options considered for the part of the clock that converts time source (for example, a pendulum) to display units (for example, clock hands) include electronics, hydraulics, fluidics, and mechanics.

A problem with using a conventional gear train (which has been the standard mechanism for the past millennium) is that gears necessarily require a ratio relationship between the timing source and the display. The required accuracy of the ratio increases with the amount of time to be measured. (For instance, for a short period of time the count of 29.5 days per lunar month may suffice, but over 10,000 years the number 29.5305882 is a much more accurate choice.)

Achieving such precise ratios with gears is possible, but awkward; similarly, gears degrade over time in accuracy and efficiency due to the deleterious effects of friction. Instead, the clock uses binary digital logic, implemented mechanically in a sequence of stacked binary adders (or as their inventor, Hillis, calls them, serial bit-adders). In effect, the conversion logic is a simple digital computer (more specifically, a digital differential analyser), implemented with mechanical wheels and levers instead of typical electronics. The computer has 32 bits of accuracy, with each bit represented by a mechanical lever or pin that can be in one of two positions. This binary logic can only keep track of elapsed time, like a stopwatch; to convert from elapsed to local solar time (that is, time of day), a cam subtracts from (or adds to) the cam slider, which the adders move.

Another advantage of the digital computer over the gear train is that it is more evolvable. For instance, the ratio of day to years depends on Earth's rotation, which is slowing at a noticeable but not very predictable rate. This could be enough to, for example, throw the phase of the Moon off by a few days over 10,000 years. The digital scheme allows that conversion ratio to be adjusted, without stopping the clock, if the length of the day changes in an unexpected way.

Location 
The Long Now Foundation has purchased the top of Mount Washington near Ely, Nevada, which is surrounded by Great Basin National Park, for the permanent storage of the full-sized clock, once it is constructed. It will be housed in a series of rooms (the slowest mechanisms visible first) in the white limestone cliffs, approximately  up the Snake Range. The site's dryness, remoteness, and lack of economic value should protect the clock from corrosion, vandalism, and development. Hillis chose this area of Nevada in part because it is home to a number of dwarf bristlecone pines, which the Foundation notes are nearly 5,000 years old. The clock will be almost entirely underground, and only accessed by foot traffic from the east once complete.

Before building the public clock in Nevada, the foundation is building a full-scale clock of similar design in a mountain near Van Horn, Texas. The test drilling for the underground construction at this site was started in 2009. The site is on property owned by Amazon founder Jeff Bezos, who is also funding its construction. The lessons learned in the construction of this first full-scale 10,000-year clock will inform the final design of the clock in Nevada.

Inspiration and support 
The project is supported by the Long Now Foundation, which also supports a number of other very-long-term projects, including the Rosetta Project (to preserve the world's languages) and the Long Bet Project.

Neal Stephenson's 2008 novel Anathem was partly inspired by his involvement with the project, to which he contributed three pages of sketches and notes.  The Long Now Foundation sells a soundtrack for the novel with profits going to the project.

Musician Brian Eno gave the Clock of the Long Now its name (and coined the term "Long Now") in an essay; he has collaborated with Hillis on the writing of music for the chimes for a future prototype.

See also 
 Astronomical clock
 Jens Olsen's World Clock
 Rasmus Sørnes

References

Further reading
 Stewart Brand, The Clock of the Long Now: Time and Responsibility. Basic Books, 2000, .
 Vincent Ialenti, “Keeping Time Into The Great Beyond.” Noema, April 2022.

External links 

 Main page for the Clock on the Long Now Foundation website
 Progress on the 10,000-year Clock a talk by Danny Hillis in September 2004 available in mp3 and Vorbis
 Wired Magazine article on the clock, May 1998
 "THE CLOCK OF THE LONG NOW": A Talk with Stewart Brand -(15 August 1998; Edge - the third culture)
 Ted Talk by Stewart Brand describing the project
 "The Clock in the Mountain" (Brand describing progress as of 2011, with videos & photographs of construction & parts)
 Danny Hillis, et al., Time in the 10,000-year clock 2011
 Interview with Danny Hillis, May 19, 2019

1999 introductions
Clocks in the United States
Long Now Foundation
Collections of the Science Museum, London
Buildings and structures celebrating the third millennium
Great Basin National Park
1999 establishments in England